The NRDC-ITA Support Brigade is one of two support brigades of the Italian Army. Originally raised on 1 October 2001 as Signal Brigade (renamed NRDC-ITA Support Brigade on 30 September 2007) the unit's mission since its inception has been to support the NATO-assigned Rapid Deployable Corps – Italy (NRDC-ITA). Unlike the multi-national staff of the NRDC-ITA the brigade is manned exclusively by Italian personnel. The brigade deployed to Afghanistan in 2006, 2009 and 2013.

Current organization 
As of the 2022 the brigade is organized as follows:

  NRDC-ITA Support Brigade, in Solbiate Olona (Lombardy)
  1st Signal Regiment, in Milan (Lombardy)
  Battalion "Spluga"
  Battalion "Sempione"
  33rd Logistic and Tactical Support Regiment "Ambrosiano", in Solbiate Olona (Lombardy)
 Command Company
 Tactical and Logistic Support Battalion
 Deployment Support Company
 Transport Company
 3rd Bersaglieri Company "Celere"
 Commissariat Company

Gorget patches 

The personnel of the brigade's units wears the following gorget patches:

References

External links 
 Official NRDC-ITA website
 Italian Army Website: NRDC-ITA Support Brigade

Italian Army Brigades
2001 establishments in Italy